Travis Alan Pastrana (born October 8, 1983) is an American professional motorsports competitor and stunt performer who has won championships and X Games gold medals in several disciplines, including supercross, motocross, freestyle motocross, and rally racing. He runs a show called Nitro Circus and the rallycross racing series Nitro Rallycross.

He is a four-time Rally America champion and has also raced in the Global RallyCross Championship, Monster Jam, and Race of Champions.

Pastrana has also driven in NASCAR, which he competes part-time in the NASCAR Craftsman Truck Series, driving the No. 41 Chevrolet Silverado for Niece Motorsports (as well as 2012, 2015, 2017 and 2020). He drove for two years in what is now the NASCAR Xfinity Series, running a part-time season in 2012 and a full season in 2013. He made his NASCAR Cup Series debut in the 2023 Daytona 500, driving the No. 67 Toyota Camry for 23XI Racing. He finished 11th after leading a lap in the 2023 Daytona 500.

Early life
Pastrana was born on October 8, 1983. He is of Puerto Rican descent by his grandparents from his father's family.  His uncle, Alan Pastrana, played as a quarterback from 1965 to 1968 at the University of Maryland, which Travis Pastrana also attended. On June 11, 2003, 19-year-old Pastrana was seriously injured when he crashed his Corvette into a tree in Davidsonville, Maryland.

Motocross
Pastrana has won three motocross racing championships: the 2000 AMA 125cc National championship, the 2001 125cc East Coast Supercross Championship, and the 125cc Rose Creek Invitational. Pastrana also raced in the 2000 Motocross des Nations. He moved up to the 250cc class in 2002. His stand-up style, ability to spot jump combinations and great speed through the whoops make him easy to spot on the track.  The Freestyle stunt riding started at a young age. At 13 years old Pastrana was already performing stunts during motocross racing, keeping the fans enthused and, later in life, leading to his career in freestyle motocross. Pastrana has always raced and competed on Suzuki motorcycles, and until recently remained fiercely loyal to the brand. He races with Team Cernic's Suzuki. All of his motorcycles and rally cars carry the number 199. He even sponsored a Monster Jam truck called Pastrana 199 and Nitro Circus, after the show on MTV. On October 3, 2014, Pastrana competed in the first ever Red Bull Straight Rhythm competition, riding in the Open Class on a Suzuki RM-Z 450 with a Honda CR500 engine swap. He dubbed the bike the RM-Zilla. However, Pastrana was eliminated early on in the bracket and James Stewart Jr. took the win.

Freestyle motocross
At age 14, Pastrana competed in and won the World Freestyle Motocross Championship in Las Vegas, Nevada, beginning a winning streak that lasted to 2003. After his gold medal performance at the 1999 X Games, Pastrana clinched the gold at the inaugural Gravity Games in Rhode Island.

Team Puerto Rico
Robert Pastrana, Travis' father, is of Colombian descent, but born and raised in Puerto Rico. which made Travis directly eligible to represent Puerto Rico in international competition.  The Puerto Rico Motorcycle Association provided him with a license to represent the Territory, which was accepted by the Unión Latinoamericana de Motociclismo, the relevant sanctioning body in Latin America. His debut with the team took place on March 15, 2008.  He qualified to the finals by winning the first heat, defeating Erick Vallejo of Mexico. In the finals he finished third, behind local Costa Rican racer Roberto Castro and Vallejo.

In 2018, Pastrana took part in the Motocross of Nations event as part of Team Puerto Rico with teammates Kevin Windham and Ryan Sipes in an effort to raise money and awareness following Hurricane Maria in 2017. All three team members eventually made it to the main event, qualifying via the B-final.

X Games and Gravity Games

X Games
 1999 – Pastrana won the first-ever MotoX Freestyle event at the X Games. He also scores the highest-ever Freestyle run score of 99.00 points.
 2000 – Pastrana won the gold medal for the second time, and attempted his first-ever backflip on a motorcycle but broke his foot.
 2001 – Pastrana won his third gold, still the only person to win the event.
 2002 – Pastrana was out with an injury. Mike Metzger became the first rider other than Pastrana to win Freestyle.
 2003 – Pastrana claimed his fourth gold and became the second rider ever to complete a 360 in competition.
 2004 – Pastrana crashed while trying a 50 ft (15m) 360, sustaining a concussion, but was able to compete the next day and won a silver medal. Nate Adams took the gold becoming the first rider to beat Pastrana. Before this event, he had won a bronze medal in Best Trick, performing a One-Handed 360, a Superman Seat Grab, and an Indian Air Back flip.
 2005 – Pastrana won his fifth gold medal in Freestyle and also attempted the first-ever Backflip Barspin on a motorcycle, however the bike failed and he resorted to a regular bike and performed a Backflip Saran Wrap to take a silver medal in Best Trick.
 2006 – Pastrana became the third athlete to win three gold medals at a single X Games event. He won golds in MotoX Best Trick, MotoX Freestyle, and Rally Car Racing. Pastrana also performed the first Double Backflip in competition, scoring a 98.60, the highest score in the Best Trick competition at X Games.
 2007 – Pastrana took bronze in Rally after sliding into the other driver's area while inside the Home Depot Center. He was disqualified but retained his medal. He also competed in the first MotoX Racing event at X Games, but did not achieve a medal after two false starts in the heat race and last-chance qualifier.
 2008 – Pastrana took gold in Rally and competed in the Speed & Style event, but did not place.
 2009 – Pastrana attempted a rodeo 720 at X Games 15 in the Moto X Best Trick Event. He crashed on his first attempt and withdrew from his second after experiencing blurred vision. He placed 4th for his efforts.  He took silver in Rally after being defeated by rookie and former IndyCar/Indy 500 champion Kenny Bräck. On November 8, Pastrana landed the famous Rodeo 720, and filmed it in his newest movie, Nitro Circus – Country Fried. Once he landed the trick, he named it the TP7, due to the fact that he was 20 degrees short of 720.
 2010 – Pastrana won Moto X Freestyle, landing yet another Double Backflip, the first one done at an X Games Freestyle. Pastrana also won Moto X Speed & Style, beating silver medalist Nate Adams by a landslide. Pastrana had problems with his Rally Car during competition, costing him gold at Rally Car Racing and a chance to compete in the new event, Super Rally.
 2011 – Pastrana launched "Pastranathon"; which included Best Trick, a race at Lucas Oil Raceway in the NASCAR Nationwide Series, and RallyCross at Staples Center in Los Angeles. However, Pastranathon seemed to be done when, in Best Trick, he attempted the TP7 and failed, landing on his right leg. He broke his foot and ankle, and was taken to a local hospital. The injury forced Pastrana to opt out of the NASCAR race, while his team worked to get Pastrana in the RallyCross event by installing a special hand-controlled device for the steering wheel, for which Pastrana had to relearn to drive the car. Pastrana won a qualifying event, then finished 4th in the final after a crash on the last lap.
 2012 – Pastrana participated in another RallyCross event. For this, he sent a challenge video to Sébastien Loeb, who was at that time the eight-time-consecutive World Rally Championship champion, asking him to race against him in the event. His invitation worked well; Loeb not only participated, but his team made a new vehicle specifically for the event. Pastrana's effort ended up only to be in vain when he was forced to retire by an accident caused by Andy Scott in the very first heat of the race. Pastrana could only watch Loeb – who dominated the whole race and got his first gold medal – in the sideways during the remainder of the event, and never actually raced against him as he had planned for.
 2015 – Pastrana made his Stadium Super Trucks debut at X Games Austin 2015. Pastrana finished last in his heat race, and was forced to run the last-chance qualifier, finishing second and advancing to the final race; he finished ninth in the final.

Gravity Games
Pastrana won five gold medals at the Gravity Games during its run from 1999 to 2006.

Rallying

In 2003, Pastrana opened a rallying career in the Race of Champions, and began driving for the Subaru-backed Vermont SportsCar rally team in 2004. Starting in 2006, Pastrana was signed by Subaru to lead their new Subaru Rally Team USA, being paired once again with veteran co-driver Christian Edstrom. On August 5, 2006 Pastrana won the gold medal in the first rally car competition at the X Games, edging out rally legend Colin McRae  by 0.53 seconds after McRae rolled his car through the last jump.

Pastrana and Edstrom clinched the 2006 Rally America National Series overall and open class championship on October 22, 2006 during day one of the Lake Superior Performance Rally. The team finished out the 2006 series with another first-place victory at the Wild West Rally in Olympia, Washington on December 31, 2006.

On December 16, 2006, Pastrana competed at the 2006 Race of Champions at the Stade de France in Paris. He represented the United States in the Nations' Cup by himself, after injuries forced teammate Jimmie Johnson and his replacement Scott Speed to withdraw.

February 19, 2007 brought news that Pastrana's longtime co-driver Edstrom had announced a sabbatical to concentrate on his career and family. Although former McRae co-driver Derek Ringer competed with Pastrana for the 100 Acre Wood Rally in Salem, Missouri and Rally America, he did not announce a permanent co-driver.

In September 2008, Pastrana took part in the Colin McRae Forest Stages Rally, a round of the Scottish Rally Championship centred in Perth in Scotland. Derek Ringer was his co-driver and they entered in a historic Ford Escort RS1600. He was one of a number of celebrity drivers to take part in the event in memory of McRae, who died in 2007.

On August 29, 2009, Pastrana claimed the overall victory at Ojibwe Forests Rally, his fifth of the 2009 Rally America season. The victory sealed his fourth consecutive Rally America driver's title, the most in series history.

In 2011, Pastrana began competing in the Global RallyCross Championship. The next year, he entered a Dodge Dart at five races, but finished only one, with a win at New Hampshire. He also ran part-time with a Dodge Dart in 2013, claiming third-place finish at Las Vegas. Pastrana entered round 2 of the 2018 Americas Rallycross Championship at Austin, finishing fourth.

In 2020, Pastrana announced plans to construct Circuit 199, a multi-purpose racing facility, in Sudlersville, Maryland. However, the project was shelved due to lawsuits filed by local conservation organizations. Later in the year, he created the Nitro Rallycross series as an expansion of the discipline's participation in the Nitro World Games. Ahead of the inaugural season in late 2021, he built a test track on a 150-acre lot he purchased near his home. He won two races, which helped him become the 2021 champion as he claimed the tiebreaker over Scott Speed.

International competition

On December 13, 2006, Subaru Rally Team USA announced plans to enter Pastrana in certain World Rally Championship events in 2007, 2008, and 2009.

In the 2007 season, he raced three P-WRC events in the Group N class, driving a Subaru Impreza WRX STI–based rally car. During March 9–11, 2007, Pastrana competed in his first world rally at the 21º Corona Rally México. He finished fifth in the P-WRC (Group N) class (the best in-class finish by an American in a WRC event since John Buffum finished third in the Acropolis Rally in 1988), followed by a tenth place in Rally Argentina and an eleventh in Rally GB.  Pastrana described his season as having gone "horribly".

Pastrana's 2008 season in the P-WRC was even less successful, with one retirement following a crash on stage one of Rally Argentina and one thirteenth place on the Acropolis Rally.

NASCAR

Pastrana made his debut in NASCAR competition by driving in the 2011 Toyota All-Star Showdown, finishing sixth. Later in the year, he competed in NASCAR driver Denny Hamlin's Short Track Showdown at Richmond International Raceway, finishing 31st after being involved in a crash on lap two. Pastrana later formed a partnership with Michael Waltrip Racing and Gary and Blake Betchel called Pastrana-Waltrip Racing, and in 2011, ran three K&N Pro Series East starts, with his debut at Richmond in the Blue Ox 100, finishing 33rd. Pastrana's plans to compete in 2011 in the Nationwide Series were cancelled as a result of his injuries at the X-Games in July of that year; as a result, his scheduled race at Indianapolis Raceway Park was officially written off as a withdrawal.

In 2012, he planned to run a full season in the Pro Series East and select Nationwide Series races. On April 27, 2012, Pastrana made his Nationwide Series debut, finishing 22nd at the Richmond 250. In his first seven races, driving the No. 99 Toyota Camry for RAB Racing in an association with MWR, Pastrana posted a best finish of 13th in the inaugural Indiana 250; at Richmond in September, he drove for NASCAR powerhouse Roush Fenway Racing in the No. 60 Ford Mustang. He also made one start in the Camping World Truck Series that year for ThorSport Racing at Las Vegas Motor Speedway, driving their No. 98 Toyota to a 15th-place finish despite a spin early in the race.

In November 2012, Pastrana was revealed to have arranged a full-season ride for 2013 in the Nationwide Series with Roush Fenway Racing. He drove in the team's No. 60 Ford during the 2013 season, posting four top-ten finishes with a best finish of ninth at Richmond International Raceway. Pastrana ended 2013 with four top tens, a pole and a 14th-place points finish, 429 points behind champion Austin Dillon.

On November 11, 2013, Pastrana announced via Facebook that he would be leaving NASCAR at the end of the 2013 season, citing a lack of sponsorship, frustration regarding his performance and a desire to spend time with his family as the reasons for his decision; Pastrana wrote:

However, he left open the possibility of running occasional Truck Series events, and has expressed a desire to compete in the Daytona 500. On September 23, 2015, Pastrana announced he would make his comeback to NASCAR, signing a one-race deal with NTS Motorsports to race the No. 31 Chevrolet in the Truck Series race at Las Vegas on October 3. After qualifying 17th, Pastrana finished 16th, two laps behind race winner John Wes Townley. He returned to the Truck Series in 2017, driving the No. 45 Chevrolet for Niece Motorsports at Las Vegas.

In 2020, Pastrana returned to NASCAR for the first time in three years, competing for Niece Motorsports again. He drove their No. 40 truck in the second of two races of the doubleheader at Kansas. This was also his first Truck Series start that was not at Las Vegas. On September 17, 2020, it was announced that Pastrana would run the Las Vegas race again with Niece. This was also the first time Pastrana made more than one Truck start in a season.

On January 13, 2023, NASCAR Cup Series team 23XI Racing tweeted a video teaser announcing that they would field a part-time third car in the 2023 Daytona 500. In it, the driver of it is facing away from the camera and wearing a hat. After a Twitter user found an image of Pastrana wearing the exact same hat, Jordan Bianchi from The Athletic reported that Pastrana would be the driver of the car. On January 17, it was officially announced that Pastrana would attempt to make the Daytona 500 for 23XI Racing, driving the No. 67 Toyota with sponsorship from Black Rifle Coffee Company. On February 14, Pastrana made the entry field by scoring the second fastest lap among the non-chartered teams. During the Daytona 500, Pastrana lead a lap under the first green flag pit cycle by accident. On the final lap, Pastrana was in a position to shoot for a Top 5 before being turned by Aric Almirola setting off a multi car crash that ended the race. Pastrana regrouped and came across the line 11th, completing all 212 laps. After the race, Pastrana was asked about his experience and he said he accomplished all his goals for the race. Pastrana also said that he would not attempt another NASCAR Cup Series race.

Other racing

Pastrana debuted in Monster Jam on October 16, 2006, driving the "Pastrana 199" monster truck. Mainly on the United States Hot Rod Association (USHRA) circuit, the truck was owned by Live Nation/FELD Motorsports and sponsored by Pastrana. The truck was originally driven by Paul Cohen, then later driven by Chad Tingler, Courtney Jolly and Cam McQueen. McQueen, a friend of Pastrana, was invited to the 2009 World Finals for his second appearance. During the 2009 World Finals the "Pastrana 199" truck changed its name to Nitro Circus. Pastrana himself competed in the freestyle competition of the event debuting the Nitro Circus truck, finishing in a three-way tie for 5th place in a field of 24 trucks.  On an episode of Nitro Circus, Pastrana attempted to backflip the Nitro Circus-themed monster truck. Though unsuccessful, he walked away without injury. On February 27, 2010 in Jacksonville, Florida, McQueen successfully executed a backflip in the Nitro Circus monster truck during the freestyle competition, making Nitro Circus the first to do so in competition. The Nitro Circus monster truck made its final appearance and was retired after the 2011 Monster Jam season.

On January 1, 2010, Pastrana officially set a new world record in a ramp-to-ramp car jump. To celebrate, after getting out of his car, he performed a gainer from the landing ramp into the harbor below.

In June 2010, Pastrana entered the Prelude to the Dream charity dirt track race at Eldora Speedway in a No. 199 Subaru. After starting 15th, he finished 23rd.

In September 2010, Pastrana set the world record for fastest ascent of Mount Washington in a car, using his Subaru WRX STi: 6 minutes, 20.47 seconds.  In June 2011, David Higgins set a new record for ascent of Mount Washington in a car, at 6 minutes, 11.54 seconds, using the same model vehicle. Pastrana retook the record in July 2017, driving his Subaru WRX STi up the mountain with a time of 5 minutes, 44.72 seconds. In August 2021 Pastrana surpassed his July 2017 record by more than 16 seconds with a time of 5 min. 28.67 sec. in his 862 hp “Airslayer” 2020 Subaru WRX STI.

Pastrana competed in the 2012 24 Hours of Daytona for AF Waltrip, with NASCAR driver Michael Waltrip, Michael Waltrip Racing owner Rob Kauffman, and road racing veteran Rui Águas as codrivers. After starting 38th, the team's Ferrari 458 finished 35th overall, 22nd in the GT class.

As part of Rally America, Pastrana raced at the 2004 and 2005 Pikes Peak International Hill Climb. He returned in 2018, in this case driving a Porsche Cayman GT4 Clubsport, claiming a class win with a 10'33.9 run.

Other activities
On September 26, 2007, Pastrana jumped out of an airplane over Arecibo, Puerto Rico, without a parachute in a carefully choreographed stunt. He met up in midair with another jumper, then latched himself into a harness to make a safe tandem landing. He "got in a lot of trouble" due to its illegality.

On Sunday, February 8, 2009 at 10 p.m., MTV Nitro Circus, his new television show of which he is an executive producer, premiered on MTV. A spinoff of MTV's Jackass, the two shows shared producers, Jeff Tremaine and was partially created by Jackass frontman Johnny Knoxville. It features Jolene Van Vugt, Erik Roner (deceased), Streetbike Tommy, Andy Bell, Jim DeChamp, among others doing dangerous stunts. ''Jackass Johnny Knoxville, Bam Margera, Chris Pontius and Steve-O; BMX freestylers, T. J. Lavin and Mat Hoffman; and actor, Gary Coleman have guest starred on various episodes. Nitro Circus was also featured in an episode of MTV's Rob Dyrdek's Fantasy Factory and vice versa.

In August 2020, Pastrana organized the Pastranaland Pit Bike Championship, an 11-team event that took place in his backyard on a track designed by Nitro Circus mechanic Hubert Rowland. Held on August 15, riders competed on Kawasaki KLX110 pit bikes.

Pastrana and the rest of Nitro Circus appeared in the music video for "Spaceship" by Puddle of Mudd.

Vegas jumps
Pastrana paid tribute to his role model growing up, legendary daredevil/stuntman Evel Knievel, by breaking a few of his records. On July 8, 2018, in Las Vegas, Nevada, Pastrana safely cleared three record-breaking big jumps, which consisted of 52 cars, 16 buses, and a fountain respectively, for a total of 484 feet of jumps in a single night.

The first jump over the cars was at 143 feet, the second jump over the buses was at 192 feet, and the third jump over the Caesar's Palace Fountain — a jump that Knievel himself wasn't able to land in 1967, when he crushed his pelvis and his femur — was at 149 feet, performed with more elevation. These feats were televised live on History.

Sponsors
Only Pastrana's personal sponsors are listed below. Sponsorships of his cars in NASCAR, which were provided through his teams and did not always overlap with his own endorsements, are not included.

Current
 Alpinestars
 Black Rifle Coffee Company
 DC Shoes
 Ethika
 Kicker Car Audio
 KTM
 Pit Viper
 Subaru
 Yokohama Rubber Company
 Troy Lee Designs

Former
 Acclaim Entertainment (under the Acclaim Max Sports label)
 AT&T
 Discount Tire
 Dodge
 Fox Racing
 KMC Wheels
 M2R Helmets
 No Fear
 Puma
 Red Bull
 SoBe
 Spy Optics
 Suzuki (from age 8 until December 2019)
 Thor Racing
 Boost Mobile (United States)

Injuries
"I don't remember most of the injuries, there have been too many." – Travis Pastrana
Injuries have often taken Pastrana off the circuit for weeks or months at a time. His medical records include: a dislocated spine, he has torn his ACL, PCL, LCL, MCL and meniscus in his left knee, broken his tibia and fibula, he has had surgery on his left wrist twice, left thumb once, two surgeries on his back, one on his right elbow, nine on his left knee, six on the right knee, one shoulder surgery which left him with the only piece of metal he has in his body.

When Pastrana was 14 years old, he was severely injured while competing in an FMX competition. The bike was stuck into the dirt ramp with the front wheel just over the top and the crankcase smashed into the dirt deep enough to support the entire motorcycle upright. He was severely injured, his spine having been separated from his pelvis. It also left him in a wheelchair for three months.

"I was in and out of consciousness for about three days and had six blood transfusions," said Pastrana. He also added that according to doctors, only three people in the U.S. have ever lived after such an injury. It was a long and difficult recovery, though Pastrana would routinely ride wheelies in his wheelchair around the hospital and therapy areas. While in the wheelchair recovering, he vowed to continue motorcycle jumping. He was also injured in July 2011 while competing at the X Games when his motorcycle did not rotate to the landing position, crushing his ankle and causing a fracture. However, Pastrana was back in his Subaru Impreza and competing in the Rally Cross final where he overshot the corner, forcing himself into the wall; on-board footage shows his leg in plaster being slammed against the wheel well, much to his discomfort.

At the 2005 Race of Champions, he broke his leg while performing at a motocross exhibition but competed in ROC anyway. Conversely, a broken pelvis during a BASE jumping accident in Florida, where he crash-landed into a park, forced him to miss the 2022 ROC.

In the media
 Pastrana, along with fellow motocross racer Jeremy McGrath, lent his name to the Acclaim-published game Freestyle Motocross: McGrath vs. Pastrana, released in 2000.
 Pastrana and McGrath starred in the 2001 Disney Channel movie Motocrossed.
 Pastrana is featured as a hidden surfer in the 2002 video game Kelly Slater's Pro Surfer.
 Pastrana appears as a playable character in the 2004 video game MTX Mototrax, as well as appearing on the game's box art. The game was originally titled Travis Pastrana's Pro MotoX and MTX: Mototrax featuring Travis Pastrana.
 Pastrana lent his voice to the 2007 game Colin McRae: DiRT as himself, and the in-menu voice. He also features as a driver in 2009's Colin McRae: DiRT 2 for Subaru Rally Team USA.
 Pastrana co-authored a book about his life, The Big Jump: The Tao of Travis Pastrana, with ESPN The Magazine senior writer Alyssa Roenigk, which was published by ESPN Books in 2007.
 A documentary about Pastrana was filmed by ESPN in 2008, titled 199 Lives: The Travis Pastrana Story.
 Pastrana is featured in X Games: The Movie; his work with motocross and rally cars is shown.
 Pastrana served as a judge on the America's Got Talent spin-off AGT: Extreme, which premiered February 21, 2022 on NBC.

Personal life
On June 4, 2011, during a live performance of Nitro Circus, he proposed to Lyn-Z Adams Hawkins, a professional skateboarder. On October 29, 2011, Hawkins and Pastrana were married in front of several family and friends in Southern California, near the home of Hawkins.  On February 26, 2013, Hawkins and Pastrana announced on their personal Facebook, Instagram, and Twitter pages that they were expecting their first child due in September 2013. Hawkins gave birth to a girl named Addy Ruth on Labor Day, September 2, 2013. On August 5, 2014, Hawkins announced in her personal page that she and Pastrana were expecting their second child due in February 2015. She gave birth to a girl named Bristol Murphy on February 9, 2015.

Pastrana lives with his family in Davidsonville, Maryland.

Racing record

Rally America results
{| class="wikitable " style="text-align:center; font-size:80%"
! colspan=45| Rally America results
|-
! Year
! Car
! 1
! 2
! 3
! 4
! 5
! 6
! 7
! 8
! 9
! Drivers Championship
! Points
! Ref
|-
| 2005
! Subaru Impreza WRX STi
| style="background:#FFF;"| Sno*DriftDNP
| style="background:#DFDFDF;"| Oregon Trail2
| style="background:#DFFFDF;"| Susquehannock Trail14
| style="background:#DFFFDF;"| Pikes Peak6
| style="background:#EFCFFF;"| Maine ForestDNF
| style="background:#FFDF9F;"| Ojibwe Forests3
| style="background:#EFCFFF;"| Colorado CogDNF
| style="background:#DFDFDF;"| LSPR2
|
! style="text-align:center; background:#CFCFFF;"| 4th
! style="text-align:center; background:#CFCFFF;"| 61
! 
|-
| 2006
! Subaru Impreza WRX STi
| style="background:#DFDFDF;"| Sno*Drift2
| style="background:#EFCFFF;"| Rally in the 100 Acre WoodDNF
| style="background:#DFDFDF;"| Oregon Trail2
| style="background:#DFDFDF;"| Susquehannock Trail2
| style="background:#DFDFDF;"| Maine Forest2
| style="background:#FFFFBF;"| Ojibwe Forests1
| style="background:#FFFFBF;"| Colorado Cog1
| style="background:#FFDF9F;"| LSPR3
| style="background:#FFFFBF;"| Wild West Rally1
! style="text-align:center; background:#FFFFBF;"| 1st
! style="text-align:center; background:#FFFFBF;"| 137
! 
|-
| 2007
! Subaru Impreza WRX STi
| style="background:#FFFFBF;"| Sno*Drift1
| style="background:#DFDFDF;"| Rally in the 100 Acre Wood2
| style="background:#EFCFFF;"| Oregon TrailDNF
| style="background:#EFCFFF;"| Olympus RallyDNF
| style="background:#FFDF9F;"| Susquehannock Trail3
| style="background:#FFFFBF;"| New England Forest Rally1
| style="background:#FFFFBF;"| Ojibwe Forests1
| style="background:#FFDF9F;"| Rally Colorado3
| style="background:#FFFFBF;"| LSPR1
! style="text-align:center; background:#FFFFBF;"| 1st
! style="text-align:center; background:#FFFFBF;"| 130
! 
|-
| 2008
! Subaru Impreza WRX STi
| style="background:#EFCFFF;"| Sno*DriftDNF
| style="background:#DFDFDF;"| Rally in the 100 Acre Wood2
| style="background:#DFDFDF;"| Olympus Rally2
| style="background:#FFFFBF;"| Oregon Trail1
| style="background:#EFCFFF;"| Susquehannock TrailDNF
| style="background:#FFDF9F;"| New England Forest Rally3
| style="background:#FFDF9F;"| Ojibwe Forests3
| style="background:#FFFFBF;"| Rally Colorado1
| style="background:#FFDF9F;"| LSPR3
! style="text-align:center; background:#FFFFBF;"| 1st
! style="text-align:center; background:#FFFFBF;"| 130
! 
|-
| 2009
! Subaru Impreza WRX STi
| style="background:#FFFFBF;"| Sno*Drift1
| style="background:#EFCFFF;"| Rally in the 100 Acre WoodDNF
| style="background:#FFFFBF;"| Olympus Rally1
| style="background:#FFFFBF;"| Oregon Trail1
| style="background:#DFDFDF;"| Susquehannock Trail2
| style="background:#FFFFBF;"| New England Forest Rally1
| style="background:#FFFFBF;"| Ojibwe Forests1
| style="background:#EFCFFF;"| Rally ColoradoDNF
| style="background:#FFFFBF;"| LSPR1
! style="text-align:center; background:#FFFFBF;"| 1st
! style="text-align:center; background:#FFFFBF;"| 151
! 
|-
| 2010
! Subaru Impreza WRX STi
| style="background:#FFFFBF;"| Sno*Drift1
| style="background:#EFCFFF;"| Rally in the 100 Acre WoodDNF
| style="background:#FFFFBF;"| Olympus Rally1
| style="background:#FFF;"| Oregon TrailDNP
| style="background:#FFF;"| Susquehannock TrailDNP
| style="background:#FFF;"| New England Forest RallyDNP
|
|
|
! style="text-align:center; background:#FFDF9F;"| 3rd
! style="text-align:center; background:#FFDF9F;"| 45
! 
|}

NASCAR
(key) (Bold – Pole position awarded by qualifying time. Italics – Pole position earned by points standings or practice time. * – Most laps led.)

Cup Series

Daytona 500

Nationwide Series

Craftsman Truck Series

 Season still in progress
 Ineligible for series points

Sports car racing

24 Hours of Daytona
(key) (Races in bold indicate pole position, Results are overall/class)

Rolex Sports Car Series results

 Season still in progress.
 Ineligible for series championship points.

Complete Global RallyCross Championship results

Supercar

References

External links
 
 
 

Living people
1983 births
Sportspeople from Annapolis, Maryland
Racing drivers from Maryland
24 Hours of Daytona drivers
NASCAR drivers
American rally drivers
Rolex Sports Car Series drivers
Porsche Supercup drivers
AMA Motocross Championship National Champions
American stunt performers
American motocross riders
Freestyle motocross riders
Motorcycle stunt performers
X Games athletes
Stadium Super Trucks drivers
NASCAR team owners
University of Maryland, College Park alumni
American sportspeople of Puerto Rican descent
Global RallyCross Championship drivers
American sportspeople of Colombian descent
World record setters in motorcycling
RFK Racing drivers
AF Corse drivers
Michael Waltrip Racing drivers